The rhombic icosahedron is a polyhedron shaped like an oblate sphere. Its 20 faces are congruent golden rhombi; 3, 4, or 5 faces meet at each vertex. It has 5 faces (green on top figure) meeting at each of its 2 poles; these 2 vertices lie on its axis of 5-fold symmetry, which is perpendicular to 5 axes of 2-fold symmetry through the midpoints of opposite equatorial edges (example on top figure: most left-hand and most right-hand mid-edges). Its other 10 faces follow its equator, 5 above and 5 below it; each of these 10 rhombi has 2 of its 4 sides lying on this zig-zag skew decagon equator. The rhombic icosahedron has 22 vertices. It has D5d, [2+,10], (2*5) symmetry group, of order 20; thus it has a center of symmetry (since 5 is odd).

Even though all its faces are congruent, the rhombic icosahedron is not face-transitive, since one can distinguish whether a particular face is near the equator or near a pole by examining the types of vertices surrounding this face.

Zonohedron 
The rhombic icosahedron is a zonohedron, that is dual to a pentagonal gyrobicupola with regular triangular, regular pentagonal, but irregular quadrilateral faces.

The rhombic icosahedron has 5 sets of 8 parallel edges, described as 85 belts.

The rhombic icosahedron forms the convex hull of the vertex-first projection of a 5-cube to 3 dimensions. The 32 vertices of a 5-cube map into the 22 exterior vertices of the rhombic icosahedron, with the remaining 10 interior vertices forming a pentagonal antiprism.

In the same way, one can obtain a Bilinski dodecahedron from a 4-cube, and a rhombic triacontahedron from a 6-cube.

Related polyhedra 
The rhombic icosahedron can be derived from the rhombic triacontahedron by removing a belt of 10 middle faces.

(*) (For example, on the left-hand figure):

The orthogonal projection of the (vertical) belt of 10 middle faces of the rhombic triacontahedron is just the (horizontal) exterior regular decagon of the common orthogonal projection.

References

External links 
  
 http://www.georgehart.com/virtual-polyhedra/zonohedra-info.html
 VRML Model 

Zonohedra